Tomaszów may refer to the following places in Poland:

 Tomaszów Bolesławiecki, village in Lower Silesian Voivodeship
 Tomaszów, Lublin Voivodeship, village in Puławy County
 Tomaszów Lubelski County, county in Lublin Voivodeship
 Tomaszów Lubelski, town and county seat
 Tomaszów Mazowiecki County, county in Łódź Voivodeship
 Tomaszów Mazowiecki, town and county seat
 Tomaszów, Opoczno County, village in Łódź Voivodeship
 Tomaszów, Radomsko County, settlement in Łódź Voivodeship
 Tomaszów, Gmina Opatów, village in Opatów County, Świętokrzyskie Voivodeship
 Tomaszów, Gmina Tarłów, village in Opatów County, Świętokrzyskie Voivodeship
 Tomaszów, Pińczów County, village in Świętokrzyskie Voivodeship
 Tomaszów, Radom County, village in Masovian Voivodeship
 Tomaszów, Szydłowiec County, village in Masovian Voivodeship

See also 
 Tomaszówka (disambiguation)
 Tomaszewo (disambiguation)
 Tomaszew (disambiguation)